Widescreen Mode (commonly abbreviated as WSM) is a heavy melodic band from Riihimäki, Finland.

History
Widescreen Mode’s members are no strangers to playing together, the four-some originally formed the band Fairlane until career decisions in the 1990s forced them to split up and move on.  When drummer Janne Aaltonen and singer Samu Brusila both moved back to Riihimäki they began discussing the possibility of forming another band. But, in the words of singer Brusila they were just that; discussions. Finally Aaltonen's fiancé intervened; tired of hearing them discuss it but never do anything about it.

The band was once again together, and in 2005 they released a demo EP and soon were playing important festivals and shows both in Finland and around Europe, supporting bands like Paradise Lost, the Cardigans, Anathema, and Die Krupps. 
In 2006, Widescreen Mode made it to the final round of the MTV-E unsigned competition out of 1,700 competing bands. They amassed 69,000 fans worldwide on MySpace and ranked among the online community's four most popular Finnish bands along with HIM, Children of Bodom, and The 69 Eyes.

Widescreen Mode's debut record Until the End was mixed by Anssi Kippo, who has engineered gold albums for Children of Bodom and Finnish Idol winner Hanna Pakarinen.

Until The End
Until the End debuted in the Finnish Top 40 at No. 34 after its release on November 14, 2007. Widescreen Mode released two singles from the album. Everlasting Bomb was the first single and reached No. 1 on the official Finnish download chart. It was also No. 1 on iTunes in Finland for sixteen consecutive weeks in 2007. The second single, Dead Inside, reached No. 1 on the Finnish Top 40 singles chart for five consecutive weeks and eight weeks overall. For several weeks in 2008, both Everlasting Bomb and Dead Inside were in Finland's Top 10. The music video for Dead Inside also received airplay in the United States on MTV2 and Fuse in 2008.

The Hanging Man

On January 25, 2009, Widescreen Mode announced their second album The Hanging Man which was released on April 9, 2009 through Dark Sentiments Records and Playground Music Scandinavia. The debut single Serotonin was released on February 20, 2009, along with a video by director Markus Aaltonen.

Fallen From The Sky

On December 7, 2011, Widescreen Mode released their third studio album Fallen from the Sky. Album features the song "If Tomorrow Comes", which had a music video released during 2010. First single from the album was "Loaded Gun", which also has a music video made out of the song

Band members

Current line-up
Samu Brusila - Vocals
Janne Lahtinen - Guitar
Janne Aaltonen - drums
Janne Stenroos - Bass guitar

Discography

Music videos
"Another Day" from Another Day EP
"Everlasting Bomb" from Until the End
"Dead Inside" from Until the End
"Serotonin" from The Hanging Man
"If Tomorrow Comes" from Fallen from the Sky
"Loaded Gun" from Fallen from the Sky

Singles
2007 Everlasting Bomb (Dark Sentiment Records)
2008 Dead Inside (Dark Sentiment Records)
2009 Serotonin (Dark Sentiment Records)
2011 Loaded Gun (Dark Sentiment Records)

External links

The Official Widescreen Mode Facebook page

Musical groups established in 2003
Finnish heavy metal musical groups